Martina Hingis and Mary Pierce were the defending champions but did not compete that year.

Lisa Raymond and Rennae Stubbs won in the final 7–6(7–5), 2–6, 7–6(8–6) against Anna Kournikova and Iroda Tulyaganova.

Seeds
Champion seeds are indicated in bold text while text in italics indicates the round in which those seeds were eliminated.

 Lisa Raymond /  Rennae Stubbs (champions)
 Nicole Arendt /  Ai Sugiyama (semifinals)
 Cara Black /  Elena Likhovtseva (first round)
 Els Callens /  Anne-Gaëlle Sidot (first round)

Draw

References
 2001 Toray Pan Pacific Open Doubles Draw

Pan Pacific Open
Toray Pan Pacific Open - Doubles
2001 Toray Pan Pacific Open